Einsteinfjellet is a mountain in Ny-Friesland at Spitsbergen, Svalbard, Norway. It has a height of 1,547 m.a.s.l., and is located at the eastern side of Austfjorden. The mountain is named after physicist Albert Einstein. Einsteinfjellet is part of the Atomfjella mountain range.

References

Mountains of Spitsbergen